Pat and Ernie is a Canadian children's music television series which aired on CBC Television in 1961.

Premise
This Vancouver-produced series featured classical music for children, hosted by Patrick Trudell (vocals) and Ernie Prentice (piano). Prentice was previously seen on CBC's A Hatful of Music (1960). Series regulars included Gavin Hussey (double bass) and Mickey McMartin (drums), who were accompanied by various visiting musicians.

Scheduling
This half-hour series was broadcast on Fridays at 3:00 p.m. (Eastern) from 6 October to 29 December 1961.

References

External links
 

CBC Television original programming
1961 Canadian television series debuts
1961 Canadian television series endings
Television shows filmed in Vancouver